Mordviny is a rural locality (a village) in Ivanovskoye Rural Settlement, Kovrovsky District, Vladimir Oblast, Russia. The population was 38 as of 2010.

Geography 
Mordviny is located on the Nerekhta River, 41 km south of Kovrov (the district's administrative centre) by road. Krasny Oktyabr is the nearest rural locality.

References 

Rural localities in Kovrovsky District